Bilk is a verb meaning to cheat. It can also refer to:

 Acker Bilk (1929–2014), clarinet player
 Bilk (drink), a milk beer made by the Abashiri brewery
 Düsseldorf-Bilk, a part of Düsseldorf in Germany